Midwinter is a surname. Notable people with the surname include:

 Billy Midwinter (1851–1890), English and Australian cricketer
 Brian Midwinter, judge in Manitoba, Canada
 Eric Midwinter (born 1932), British educator and writer

English-language surnames
Surnames of English origin